Leidys Brito (born July 5, 1984) is an athlete from Venezuela who competes in archery.

2008 Summer Olympics
At the 2008 Summer Olympics in Beijing, Brito finished her ranking round with a total of 628 points. This gave her the 36th seed for the final competition bracket in which she faced Wu Hui-Ju in the first round, beating the archer from Chinese Taipei 104–98. In the second round she was unable to beat fourth seed Khatuna Narimanidze of Georgia who won the confrontation with 111–98.

2012 Summer Olympics

At the 2012 Summer Olympics in London, Brito finished the ranking round with 634 points, and drew Cheng Ming in the first knockout round.  She lost to Cheng, who was the eventual silver medallist.

References

External links
 

1984 births
Living people
Olympic archers of Venezuela
Archers at the 2007 Pan American Games
Archers at the 2008 Summer Olympics
Archers at the 2011 Pan American Games
Archers at the 2012 Summer Olympics
Archers at the 2016 Summer Olympics
Venezuelan female archers
Archers at the 2015 Pan American Games
Central American and Caribbean Games silver medalists for Venezuela
Central American and Caribbean Games bronze medalists for Venezuela
Competitors at the 2006 Central American and Caribbean Games
South American Games gold medalists for Venezuela
South American Games bronze medalists for Venezuela
South American Games silver medalists for Venezuela
South American Games medalists in archery
Competitors at the 2010 South American Games
Competitors at the 2014 South American Games
Central American and Caribbean Games medalists in archery
Pan American Games competitors for Venezuela
People from Maturín
Archers at the 2003 Pan American Games
Pan American Games bronze medalists for Venezuela
Pan American Games medalists in archery
Medalists at the 2003 Pan American Games
21st-century Venezuelan women